Buffalo Gun is a 1961 American western film directed by Albert C. Gannaway and starring Marty Robbins, Webb Pierce, Carl Smith, Mary Ellen Kay. The film was shot in 1957 in Ray Corrigan Ranch, California and released in 1961.

Plot

Cast
Webb Pierce as Webb Pierce
Carl Smith as Carl Smith
Marty Robbins as Marty Robbins
Wayne Morris as Roche
Don "Red" Barry as Murdock
Mary Ellen Kay as Clementine Hubbard
Douglas Fowley as Sheriff
Harry Lauter as Vin
Eddie Crandall as Eddie Hubbard
Gordon Stoker as 1st Tenor Member of the Jordanaires (as The Jordainaires)
Bill Coontz as Cocha
Neal Matthews Jr. as 2nd Tenor Member of the Jordanaires (as The Jordanaires)
Hoyt Hawkins as Baritone Member of the Jordanaires (as The Jordanaires)
Eddie Little Sky as Sartu (as Eddie Little)
Hugh Jarrett as Bass Member of the Jordanaires (as The Jordanaires)
Charles Soldani as Chief

References

External links
 

1961 films
American black-and-white films
American Western (genre) films
1961 Western (genre) films
1960s English-language films
1960s American films